Bent is a surname common in English speaking countries.  It may refer to:

 Alex Bent (born 1993), percussionist for American heavy metal band Trivium
 Amel Bent (born 1985), French singer
 Arthur Cleveland Bent (1866–1954), American ornithologist
 Bruce R. Bent, American financier
 Charles Bent (1799–1847), first American Governor of the New Mexico Territory
 Charles Bent (1919–2004), composer of chess endgame studies
 Cory Bent (born 1997), English footballer
 Darren Bent (born 1984), English football (soccer) player
 Ellis Bent (1783–1815), Deputy Judge Advocate for New South Wales, Australia
 Geoff Bent (1932–1958), English football (soccer) player
 George Bent (1843–1918), a son of William Bent, American Civil War soldier and Cheyenne warrior
 Henry A. Bent (1926/1927–2015), physical chemist
 James Theodore Bent (1852–1897), English explorer and archaeologist
 Jason Bent (born 1977), Canadian football (soccer) player
 Jeffery Hart Bent (1781–1852), first judge of the colony of New South Wales, Australia
 Jevene Bent, former Jamaican police officer 
 John Bent (disambiguation), multiple people
 Junior Bent (born 1970), English football (soccer) player
 Kimball Bent (1837–1916), American soldier and adventurer
 Lyriq Bent, Canadian actor
 Marcus Bent (born 1978), English football (soccer) player
 Margaret Bent (born 1940), English musicologist
 Paul Bent (born 1965), former English cricketer
 Philip Bent (1891–1917), Canadian recipient of the Victoria Cross
 Ridley Bent (born 1979), Canadian indie rock singer-songwriter
 Silas Bent (1768–1827), judge on the bench of the Missouri Supreme Court
 Silas Bent (1820–1887), U.S. Navy officer
 Silas Bent (1852–1945), American journalist
 Spencer John Bent (1891–1977), English Victoria Cross recipient
 Thomas Bent (1838–1909), Australian politician, 22nd Premier of Victoria
 William Bent (1809–1869), American trapper, rancher and frontier diplomat